The Phantom Zone is a prison-like parallel dimension appearing in American comic books published by DC Comics. It is mainly associated with stories featuring Superman. It first appeared in Adventure Comics #283 (April 1961), and was created by Robert Bernstein and George Papp. It was frequently used in the Superman comics before the continuity was rebooted in the 1980s, after Crisis on Infinite Earths, and has appeared occasionally since.

Fictional history

Pre-Crisis
The Phantom Zone was a "pocket universe" discovered by Jor-El that existed outside the space-time continuum; it was used on the planet Krypton as a humane method of imprisoning criminals. Kryptonians had abolished the death penalty in the long distant past. In more recent history, criminals were punished by being sealed into capsules and rocketed into orbit in suspended animation with crystals attached to their foreheads to slowly erase their criminal tendencies; Klax-Ar was one criminal who received this punishment but escaped. Gra-Mo was the last to suffer the punishment, for it was then abolished in favor of the Zone.

The inmates of the Phantom Zone reside in a ghost-like state of existence from which they can observe, but cannot interact with, the regular universe. Inmates do not age or require sustenance in the Phantom Zone; furthermore, they are telepathic and mutually insubstantial. As such, they were able to survive the destruction of Krypton and focus their attention on Earth, as most of the surviving Kryptonians now reside there. Most have a particular grudge against Superman because his father created the method of their damnation, and was often the prosecutor at their trials. When they manage to escape, they usually engage in random destruction, particularly easy for them since, on Earth, each acquires the same powers as Superman. Nevertheless, Superman periodically released Phantom Zone prisoners whose original sentences had been completed, and most of these went to live in the bottle city of Kandor.

The sole inmate of the Phantom Zone who was not placed there as punishment for a crime is Mon-El, a Daxamite who fell victim to lead poisoning. Superboy was forced to cast him into the Phantom Zone to keep him alive, where he remained for nearly a thousand Earth years until the time of the Legion of Super-Heroes when Brainiac 5 created a medication that allowed him to leave safely.

Green Lantern Guy Gardner once experienced an extended and tortuous stay after an explosion of a Green Lantern power battery sent him there, until rescued by Superman and Green Lantern Hal Jordan, who had believed him to be dead all that time.

Phantom Girl can enter or leave the Phantom Zone as she pleases, and once did so to interrogate the prisoners about Jor-El.

Superman develops communications equipment for the Phantom Zone, like the Zone-o-Phone, and refinements to the projector. In addition, the city of Kandor uses the Phantom Zone regularly, with parole hearings sometimes chaired by Superman. However, since the departure of Kandor, that is, outside of Mon-El, most of the inhabitants were confined to lifers and generally not inclined to making conversation with their jailer. As for Superman himself, as much as he appreciates how the Zone is necessary to contain its Kryptonian inmates, who otherwise would be extremely dangerous and destructive in a yellow-sun environment, and to shelter Mon-El, he apparently privately harbors concerns about the justness of its penal use. This is illustrated in the acclaimed story "For the Man Who Has Everything" by Alan Moore and Dave Gibbons, where Clark is ensnared in a fantasy illusion created by an alien parasitical plant called a Black Mercy. As his subconscious resists the illusion of a peaceful life on Krypton, among the first signs of its degeneration is the sight of his cousin, Kara Zor-El, hospitalized after being attacked by an anti-Phantom Zone militant who left literature protesting that the Phantom Zone is a method of torture.

In the Steve Gerber miniseries The Phantom Zone #1-4 (January–April 1982), it is revealed that the Zone not only has a breach through which other inmates had escaped, but that they were never heard from again. The imprisoned Superman and Quex-Ul use this method and travel through several dimensional "layers" seeking the exit into the physical universe. They finally encounter a Kryptonian wizard named Thul-Kar, who tells them that he believed Jor-El's prophecy of Krypton's doom and entered the Phantom Zone through magic. Using the same breach, he discovered the truth about the Phantom Zone: all its levels are manifestations of the consciousness of a sentient, malevolent entity called Aethyr, The Oversoul.

As explained by Thul-Kar, Aethyr itself came into being uncounted millennia ago when two spiral galaxies collided at an almost primordial stage after the physical universe's creation. Countless worlds were simultaneously destroyed and the deaths of so many beings merged somehow to form a single, evil consciousness that called itself Aethyr The Oversoul. This supremely powerful entity enclosed itself into a dimension outside the physical universe within itself, forming the Phantom Zone.

The Zone itself is an interface between the Earth-One dimension (the physical universe) and Aethyr's mind, the outer layer (where zone criminals are housed) representing its ability for abstract thought; the Zone is basically Aethyr's capacity to imagine other possibilities of existence, and is the outermost template of its consciousness. Only by entering Aethyr's core realm can a zone prisoner escape back to the physical universe, but this process is dangerous since any being who tries risks being destroyed in numerous ways as well as by forever having their souls merged with Aethyr's essence while within Aethyr's core realm. This is because as someone enters deeper into Aethyr's consciousness, then no longer exist as an abstract entity and its existence becomes subject to Aethyr's whims. When attacking Superman and Quex-Ul, Aethyr personified itself as an aggressive, purple-skinned dog's head that breathed flames capable of destroying and absorbing the souls of those that it wishes to conquer. While Quex-Ul is killed by Aethyr in this fashion, Superman manages to make his way out of the Phantom Zone by avoiding those flames and flying directly through Aethyr's skull and its mind, returning to Earth through a tear in the fabric of Aethyr's mind and the physical universe, but not without encountering the horrific remains of all of the souls entrapped within Aethyr over the millennia.

Mister Mxyzptlk is later possessed by Aethyr. During the process while Mxyzptlk is imprisoned on his own home dimension, Thul-Kar communicates with Mxyzptlk and offers him an escape in exchange for the merger. This merger, however, empties the Phantom Zone of its criminal inhabitants. As the Phantom Zone villains head to Earth to conquer it, Thul-Kar and Nam-Ek are re-absorbed into Aethyr. Superman awakes and sees that the Phantom Zone villains are wreaking havoc on Earth, causing destruction to the Capitol Building in Washington, D.C. and demanding Superman come out and fight them. Superman battles the Phantom Zone villains in Washington D.C. While fighting Faora Hu-Ul, he witnesses her disappearing as she is absorbed into Aethyr. Mister Mxyzpltk reveals that his strong personality has taken over Aethyr and he absorbs all the rest of the Phantom Zone inhabitants back into himself, determined to torture them endlessly and wreak havoc as he sees fit. Mxyzpltk-Aethyr leaves, intending to next take over the Fifth Dimension, and Superman is left to put out the fires in Washington and then rid Metropolis of the Kryptonite remains of Argo City.

Post-Crisis

In the Post-Crisis DC Universe, the Phantom Zone first appears after Superman returns from space with a Kryptonian artifact called the Eradicator. This device, created by his Kryptonian ancestor Kem-L, attempts to recreate Krypton on Earth, building the Fortress of Solitude; the extradimensional space in which the Eradicator finds the Kryptonian materials necessary is called the Phantom Zone. A Phantom Zone Projector is part of Superman's current Fortress. It has been used to access the Bottle City of Kandor and to trap villains such as the White Martians.

The Phantom Zone has been independently discovered by various characters where it is called the "Buffer Zone" by the Bgztlians, the "Still Zone" by the White Martians, the "Stasis Zone" by Loophole, the "Ghost Zone" by Prometheus, and the "Honeycomb" by the Queen Bee I. In Post-Crisis/Post-Zero Hour continuity, it was Loophole's "Stasis Zone" technology that exiled Mon-El, known in the new continuity as Valor/M'Onel, into the Phantom Zone for 1,000 years.

Superman fashions the Phantom Zone technology into an arrow projectile which upon striking a victim will project them into the Phantom Zone. Roy Harper, the original Speedy, steals this arrow from Superman when the original Teen Titans are invited for a visit many years ago. Roy, however, never uses the arrow and passes it on to his replacement, Mia Dearden, who uses the arrow during the events of Infinite Crisis on Superboy-Prime. He is too strong for even the Phantom Zone arrow, and manages to break out.

At one point, the White Martians imprison Batman in the Phantom Zone and take his identity as Bruce Wayne.

Batman devises a measure made after Superman recovers from his first battle with Doomsday, that, when the Justice League or any other superhero groups encounter a Doomsday Level Threat, a group of heroes, authority, and military forces will contain it within a proximity after clearing all civilians within it. If Superman and the rest fall, the Doomsday Protocol will commence by sending it to the Phantom Zone.

In Action Comics, General Zod, along with Ursa and Non, appear in search of the son of Zod and Ursa.

Supergirl #16 shows a form of life native to the Phantom Zone. These Phantoms are enraged over the use of their universe to house criminals and seek revenge on the one responsible.

During the "New Krypton" storyline, the Kryptonians in Kandor have started to take matters into their own hands and started rounding up some of Superman's enemies to throw them into the Phantom Zone. First, they attack the Science Police where they make off with the Parasite. The second target is Silver Banshee who the Kandorians chase across the skies. At Arkham Asylum, the Kryptonians knock out Nightwing and Robin where they make off with Toyman while another group knocks out Black Lightning to claim Toyman. Bizarro is even attacked by Thara's group while flying. While Superman, Supergirl, and Zora are disgusted at what some of the Kandorians did and demands the ones responsible to turn themselves over to the authorities, Alura would not cooperate and gives the orders to throw the villains that they rounded up into the Phantom Zone. Those who were thrown into the Phantom Zone were later freed by Superman.

In the miniseries 52 the Phantom Zone is ingested by Mister Mind while he is mutating into a giant insect form. Once full-grown, Mind regurgitates it in an attempt to destroy Booster Gold and Rip Hunter, but the attack is deflected by Supernova, who returns the Phantom Zone to its proper dimensional plane. Supernova is able to control the Zone as his supersuit's powers are based upon Phantom Zone projector technology stolen by Rip Hunter.

In Action Comics #874, the Phantom Zone vanished. Action Comics #886 offers a possible explanation as to the Phantom Zone's disappearance, the theory being that the Phantom Zone was actually the mythical Nightwing, counterpart to the Flamebird, imprisoned in an altered state of being. Having chosen a new Avatar, Chris Kent, who was freed from the Zone, he too would have been freed from his shackles, thus causing the Phantom Zone to cease to exist.

In Adventure Comics (vol. 2) #11, the Phantom Zone is recreated by Chameleon Boy and Superman.

The New 52
In The New 52, Jor-El suggests going into the Phantom Zone when Krypton was about to explode. Zod, however, appears with other Phantom Zone prisoners and attempts to escape the Phantom Zone. Krypto sacrifices himself by attacking Xa-Du, thus going into the Phantom Zone as well.

It is revealed that Doctor Xa-Du was the first Kryptonian prisoner to be sent to the Phantom Zone due to his forbidden experiments in suspended animation, with Jor-El executing the sentence. The Phantom Zone is reverted to the Pre-Crisis version.

DC Rebirth
During the Dark Days: Metal event of the DC Rebirth reboot, Superman has theorized that the Phantom Zone might be actually a permeable membrane between Earth-0 (DC Universe) and the Dark Multiverse.

Known inmates

Inmates in Pre-Crisis
Throughout the Silver Age of Comic Books, the following inhabitants of the Phantom Zone have been depicted. Based on this list, at least 34 Kryptonians were projected into the Phantom Zone on Krypton over a period of less than 256 Kryptonian days. Refer to the entry on the Kryptonian Calendar for details on the relationship between Kryptonian sun-cycles and Earth years.

 Ak-Var - Ak-Var was sentenced to approximately 30 Earth years (22 Kryptonian sun-cycles) in the Phantom Zone for plotting to steal a revered relic called a Sun-Stone from a museum. After he had served his full sentence, Ak-Var was released by Superman and brought to the bottle-city of Kandor. Ak-Var became the lab assistant of Superman's cousin, Van-Zee. Sometime later, Van-Zee adopted the costumed identity of Nightwing and Ak-Var became his partner Flamebird.
 Ar-Val - Ar-Val was sentenced to 50 Kryptonian sun-cycles (68.5 Earth years) in the Phantom Zone for destroying priceless knowledge and depriving Krypton of 1,000 years of scientific progress.  When an alien space warship that was approaching Earth exploded, the blast opened a temporary rift in the Zone. Ar-Val escaped the Zone, captured and imprisoned Wonder Woman, then impersonated her so that she could trick Superman into marriage. Ar-Val figured that Superman would never suspect his wife of ruling the crime world. Superman uncovered her deception and returned her to the Phantom Zone.
 Az-Rel - Az-Rel was a petty criminal from Bokos, the Island of Thieves. He possessed pyrotic powers. His partner, Nadira, possessed psychokinetic powers. Together they robbed helpless victims in Erkol, the oldest city of Krypton. Both were captured and sentenced to 15 Kryptonian sun-cycles (20.55 Earth years) in the Phantom Zone. The two criminals were among those freed from the Zone when Quex-Ul was manipulated into building and activating a crude Phantom Zone Projector. Later, Nadira was killed when the dying Jer-Em exposed her to green kryptonite. In her dying agony, Nadira telekinetically inflicted pain on Az-Rel, which unleashed his pyrokinesis upon himself, incinerating him.
 Bal-Gra - The history and sentencing of this prisoner was not revealed. Bal-Gra once escaped from the Phantom Zone through a temporary space-warp. He boasted to Superman that he was the strongest man on Krypton. Lois Lane managed to expose Bal-Gra to Gold Kryptonite, which permanently robbed him of his superpowers. He was then sent back into the Zone by Lorraine Lewis, a brilliant scientist who had built her own Phantom Zone projector.
 Blak-Du - The history and sentencing of this prisoner was not revealed. Blak-Du was Jor-El's roommate at Krypton College, and was rated as scientifically brilliant.
 Cha-Mel - Cha-Mel was a clever youngster who developed a secret spray that enabled him to control his appearance. He turned to crime, but made the fatal mistake of impersonating Jor-El and attempting to rob his house. Jor-El returned home too soon and foiled Cha-Mel's attempt. The young thief was sentenced to the Phantom Zone for his crime. Years later, Cha-Mel managed to take the form of Superboy and trick the real Superboy into entering the Zone. Cha-Mel then manipulated Superboy's parents into freeing him. He tried to secure the Phantom Zone projector to free the other prisoners, but the device was destroyed in a tug-of-war with Krypto, returning him to the Phantom Zone while freeing Superboy.
 General Zod – Sentenced to 40 Kryptonian sun-cycles (54.8 Earth years) for using a duplicator ray to create a private army of imperfect clones (Bizarros) to overthrow the government.
 Erndine Ze-Da (Zeda) - The history and sentencing of this prisoner was not revealed. One day, a South Seas volcano exploded and the concussion opened a temporary gap in the Phantom Zone, enabling both Erndine Ze-Da and Dr. Xadu to escape. They concocted a plan to trap Superboy in the Zone, but he became aware of their scheme and stranded them on the planet Exon. Years later, Erndine and Dr. Xadu, who had since married and acquired the secret of the cosmic power-grip, escaped from Exon and returned to Earth. Superman defeated them again, and placed them in separate cells on two different worlds.
 Faora – A martial arts expert and hater of males, who was sentenced to 300 Kryptonian sun-cycles (411 Earth years) in the Phantom Zone for causing the deaths of 23 men in her own concentration camp. She once escaped captivity by using telepathy to manipulate an Earthman named Jackson Porter into freeing her from the Zone.
 Gann Artar - In one imaginary story, a criminal named Gann Artar was sentenced to 50 Kryptonian sun-cycles (68.5 Earth years) for using his de-evolutionary ray to create large, dangerous monsters.
 Gaz-Or (AKA The Mighty Gazor) - After a lifetime of scientific villainy and because he was dying of old age, the Mighty Gazor attempted to use his earthquake machine to destroy Krypton. He was stopped by Jor-El, who had arrived just in time and was sentenced to the Phantom Zone for his crime. Gazor claimed that he had received the longest sentence ever given to anyone condemned to the Phantom Zone. This contradicts the fact that Jax-Ur and Orn-Zu both received life sentences. However, after Mon-El was released from the Zone in the 30th Century, Gazor was indeed the only prisoner remaining in that ghostly dimension.
 Gor-Nu - Once the greatest biochemist on Krypton, Gor-Nu's reckless experiments caused several deaths. He was sentenced to 50 Kryptonian sun-cycles (68.5 Earth years) in the Phantom Zone. When a lethal crystal-menace threatened to destroy the bottle-city of Kandor, Superman released Gor-Nu in the hope that he could figure out a way to stop it. Gor-Nu was successful, but he then tried to betray Superman. Gor-Nu's plans were foiled and he was returned to the Phantom Zone.
 Gra-Mo and two assistants - The criminal Gra-Mo and his two assistants (one possibly named Ni-Van) were captured, sentenced to life for attempting to take over Krypton with Gra-Mo's robot hordes, placed in suspended animation, and imprisoned in a space capsule which was placed into orbit around Krypton. They were the last criminals to receive this type of punishment. After Krypton's destruction, the capsule drifted through space, and they eventually awakened and traveled to Earth. When Superboy learned of their criminal nature, he figured out a way to defeat them and projected them into the Phantom Zone.
 The Inventor - The history and sentencing of this non-Kryptonian prisoner was not revealed.
 Jackson Porter of Earth - Phantom Zone prisoner Faora used telepathy to delude Jackson Porter into believing she was the ghost of his dead wife Katie. Faora soon manipulated him into freeing her from the Phantom Zone. After she was returned to her prison, the permanently deluded Jackson chose to follow her into the Phantom Zone.
 Jax-Ur – A rogue Kryptonian scientist who was sentenced to an eternity in the Phantom Zone for breaking the law forbidding anyone to experiment with an untested explosive. His rocket missed its target and destroyed Wegthor, an inhabited moon of Krypton, killing 500 colonists. He was the first prisoner projected into the Phantom Zone on Krypton. Jax-Ur also became the first prisoner to escape the Phantom Zone when a passing comet created a momentary warp through which he slipped.
 Jer-Em – Jer-Em was a religious fanatic who was sentenced to 30 Kryptonian sun-cycles (41.1 Earth years) in the Phantom Zone for wiping out the superpowers of the people of Argo City (the birthplace of the future Supergirl) by guiding it back toward a red sun, leaving the residents stranded in their city in space. Jer-Em was among those freed from the Phantom Zone when Quex-Ul was manipulated into building and activating a crude Phantom Zone Projector. Later, Jer-Em purposely exposed himself to Green Kryptonite in order to enter the Kryptonian afterlife.
 Kru-El - A weapons designer and cousin of Jor-El (the father of the future Superman). He was sentenced to 35 Kryptonian sun-cycles (47.95 Earth years) for developing an arsenal of super-powerful, forbidden weapons.
 Kur-Dul - The history and sentencing of this prisoner was not revealed. Kur-Dul served his full sentence and was released by Superman and the Kandorian parole board.
 Lar Gand of Daxam (Mon-El) – A superpowered youth arrived on Earth with amnesia. He was found by Superboy, who suspected the youth may be his older brother. Superboy named him Mon-El, because they met on a Monday. When Mon-El was later exposed to lead, he collapsed in pain. His memory returned, and he explained that he is from the planet Daxam, whose natives have a lethal vulnerability to lead. To save Mon-El's life, Superboy projected him into the Phantom Zone. Mon-El spent 1,000 years in the Zone before he was released and cured by the Legion of Super-Heroes.
 Lar-On - Lar-On found himself inflicted with a werecreature disease for which there was no known cure. He was sent into the Phantom Zone by Jor-El until a cure could be found for the disease. Lar-On was later unwittingly freed by a scientist named Professor Jeremiah Terry when he attempted to create a portal to Earth-Two. Lar-On was captured by Superman and Batman, who returned him to the Zone.
 Lester Wallace of Earth - After being mentally manipulated by the Phantom Zone prisoner Zan-Em into developing a deep hatred of aliens and causing him to betray Superboy, Lester Wallace realized he had become the very thing he despised. He projected himself into the Phantom Zone as punishment.
 L. Finn - The history and sentencing of this non-Kryptonian prisoner was not revealed.
 Lois Lane of Earth – Lois Lane time-traveled back to Krypton before it exploded and was accidentally trapped in the Phantom Zone by Jor-El when he was testing his new Projector device. She spent more than two and a half decades there before she was discovered and released by Superman.
 Marok - The history and sentencing of this prisoner was not revealed.
 Murkk - The history and sentencing of this prisoner was not revealed. Murkk was among a group of Phantom Zone prisoners who escaped by focusing their mental energies on a piece of Jewel Kryptonite. He was later disintegrated by the Vrangs.
 Nadira Va-Dim - Nadira was a petty criminal from Bokos, the Island of Thieves. She possessed psychokinetic powers. Her partner, Az-Rel, possessed pyrotic powers. Together they robbed helpless victims in Erkol, the oldest city of Krypton. Both were captured and sentenced to 15 Kryptonian sun-cycles (20.55 Earth years) in the Phantom Zone. The two criminals were among those freed from the Zone when Quex-Ul was manipulated into building and activating a crude Phantom Zone Projector. Later, Nadira was killed when the dying Jer-Em exposed her to green kryptonite.
 Nam-Ek - Rondors were hideous, foul-smelling Kryptonian beasts whose horns radiated a natural healing ray. So valuable were the animals that their slaughter was outlawed. 500 years ago, Nam-Ek, a Kryptonian scientist, killed two Rondors so that he could study their horns' powers. He extracted a serum from the healing horns, which would grant immortality. When four people died because no Rondors were available, he was charged with murder. He evaded capture and drank the serum. In the next instant, he mutated into an immortal humanoid Rondor. 500 years later when Krypton exploded, Nam-Ek was left drifting in space. Nam-Ek was later retrieved by Amalak the Kryptonian-Killer, who attempted to kill him, but discovered that it was impossible. When Amalak's spaceship entered a yellow sun-system, Nam-Ek gained superpowers and headed to Earth to warn Superman. After Amalak's defeat, Nam-Ek was projected into the Phantom Zone by Superman because he had been exhibiting dangerous bouts of insanity.
 Orn-Zu - Believing that Krypton's sun would soon go nova, Orn-Zu created Jorlan, an android designed to hypnotically lure children away. He intended to use it to save his world's youth by kidnapping them and taking them away from Krypton. Orn-Zu was sentenced to an eternity in the Phantom Zone. When Jorlan arrived on Earth, it attempted to complete its mission. Orn-Zu convinced Superman to release him from the Zone, and they both confronted the android. Already dying from Pythagra Fever, Orn-Zu sacrificed his life to help stop his creation.
 Py-Ron (Evil-Man) - Py-Ron was sentenced to 50 Kryptonian sun-cycles (68.5 Earth years) in the Phantom Zone for using forbidden experiments to turn humans into weird, bird-like monsters. Years later, a volcanic eruption freed Py-Ron from the Phantom Zone. He donned a costume and harassed Superman, using the name Evil-Man. Superman soon captured Py-Ron and returned him to his prison. A few years after that, when Supergirl was forced through hypnosis by the Sisterhood of Evil to test a deadly poison on a super-human, Py-Ron agreed to be her test subject. When Py-Ron appeared to die, Supergirl was then forced to give the poison to Superman and herself. Luckily, Comet the Super-Horse had learned of the poison and altered it with his X-ray vision so that it only put the victims into suspended animation for a few hours. When Py-Ron woke up, he tried to earn his right to stay out of the Zone by flying to Feminax, the Sisterhood's homeworld, and killing everyone in retaliation. For his heartless action, Superman projected Py-Ron back into the Phantom Zone.
 Quex-Ul (Charlie Kweskill) – Quex-Ul was sentenced to nearly 25 Earth years (18 Kryptonian sun-cycles) in the Phantom Zone for slaying the rare Rondors and cutting off their radiant, curative horns. He was the last prisoner projected into the Phantom Zone on Krypton. When he served his full sentence, Quex-Ul notified Superman and was released. Quex-Ul intended on getting revenge on Jor-El, the man who sentenced him to the Phantom Zone, by exposing his son Superman to Gold Kryptonite. When Superman proved that Quex-Ul was innocent, having been framed by Rog-Ar, Quex-Ul attempted to stop Superman from being exposed. Quex-Ul inadvertently exposed himself and was robbed of his powers and his memory. Clark Kent set Quex-Ul up with a job at the Daily Planet using the alias Charlie Kweskill. Quex-Ul later sacrificed his life in a battle against the entity called Aethyr.
 Ral-En - A college friend and associate of Jor-El and son of the famous psychologist Mag-En. With the help of his father, Ral-En used hyper-hypnotism to make everyone believe that he had gained superpowers, then attempted to become ruler of Krypton. Jor-El exposed his scheme, and Ral-En was sentenced to the Phantom Zone. The existence of both baby Kal-El (Superman) and the city of Kandor were crucial to this story. Since Kandor was stolen by Brainiac before the birth of Kal-El and the invention of the Phantom Zone projector, this entire story is impossible.
 Ran-Zo - The history and sentencing of this prisoner was not revealed.
 Ras-Krom - The history and sentencing of this prisoner was not revealed. Ras-Krom was a superstitious Kryptonian criminal who escaped the Phantom Zone when an atomic blast opened a small gap between worlds. He attempted to release the other prisoners, but was outwitted and re-imprisoned by Superman and Jimmy Olsen.
 Roz-Em - The criminal Roz-Em had plastic surgery to look exactly like Nim-El (Jor-El's twin brother). He attempted to steal a valuable weapon from the Armory of Forbidden Weapons, but was captured by Jor-El and the real Nim-El. He was placed in suspended animation, and imprisoned in a space capsule which was placed into orbit around Krypton. After Krypton's destruction, the capsule drifted through space, and Roz-Em eventually awakened and traveled to Earth. He planned on getting his revenge on Nim-El's nephew, Superboy, by pretending to be a Superman created from Superboy's exposure to Red Kryptonite. Superboy discovered Roz-Em's ruse and projected him into the Phantom Zone.
 Shyla Kor-Onn - A brilliant scientist named Shyla Kor-Onn was sentenced to one Kryptonian sun-cycle (1.37 Earth years) for the crime of manslaughter. She was trapped in the Phantom Zone well past her punishment period due to Krypton's destruction. After countless failures, Shyla predicted that she could use her mental powers to manipulate a jet pilot into flying his plane in a specific manner which would create a rip in the Zone. She escaped from her prison and battled Supergirl. When Shyla attempted to use the Phantom Zone Projector in Superman's Fortress of Solitude to free the other Phantom Zone prisoners, Supergirl was able to project her back into the Zone. A short time later, Shyla was freed in the bottle-city of Kandor, where she attempted to get her revenge on Supergirl.
 Tal-Var of the Dark Dimension - Jimmy Olsen accidentally released the evil Tal-Var from the Dark Dimension. He intended to loot and lay waste to the Earth, then to trap and kill Superman. Using his wits, Jimmy was able to project the alien into the Phantom Zone before he could carry out his threats.
 Thul-Kar - The last of the Wizards of Juru, Thul-Kar used magic to teleport himself into the Phantom Zone on the day of Krypton's destruction. He was the first to discover the Phantom Zone's connections to the entity called Aethyr.
 Tor-An - Condemned to the Phantom Zone for carrying out forbidden experiments transferring the minds of a Kryptonian family into the bodies of monsters. Years later, he instructed a group of Phantom Zone prisoners to use their combined mental powers to prompt the Mayor of Midvale to ask Supergirl to perform a feat which would open a small rift in the Zone. The handsome Tor-An escaped and tricked Supergirl into marrying him. When he began to gloat that she would now be forever disgraced, he learned to his dismay that the marriage was invalid and that he himself had been tricked by Supergirl. He was quickly captured and returned to his prison.
 The Toyman - The history and sentencing of this non-Kryptonian prisoner was not revealed.
 Tra-Gob – Tra-Gob was the leader of a band of Kryptonian thieves which raided the priceless Science Archives. He was betrayed by his own men, but was rescued by Jor-El before they could exterminate him. Tra-Gob was sentenced to nearly 40 Earth years (29 Kryptonian sun-cycles) for his crime, but still remained deeply grateful to Jor-El. Tra-Gob was in the Phantom Zone for nearly 30 Earth years before he escaped due to a freak disruption by the aurora borealis. He rescued Superman and Lois Lane from a Kryptonian monster, repaying his debt to Jor-El. As Tra-Gob was being returned to the Zone to finish out his sentence, Superman commented that he may be pardoned in Kandor for his good behavior.
 Tyb-Ol - The history and sentencing of this prisoner was not revealed. Tyb-Ol was among a group of Phantom Zone prisoners who escaped by focusing their mental energies on a piece of Jewel Kryptonite. He was later disintegrated by the Vrangs.
 Professor Va-Kox (Professor Vakox) - Va-Kox, a mad geneticist, was sentenced to 50 Kryptonian sun-cycles (68.5 Earth years) for tossing a test tube full of his life force experiment into the Great Krypton Lake, creating a huge mutated monster.
 Vax-Nor - The history and sentencing of this prisoner was not revealed. Vax-Nor served his full sentence and was released by Superman and the Kandorian parole board.
 Vorb-Un - Vorb-Un was sentenced to 10 Kryptonian sun-cycles (13.7 Earth years) in the Phantom Zone for experimenting with forbidden elements without the Science Council's permission. During a parole hearing in Kandor, Vorb-Un explained to Superman and the parole board that his sentence was almost up, and he insisted that he had repented. Due to his advanced age and his sincere remorse, he was released from his prison.
 Vor-Kil - The crime and sentencing of this prisoner was not revealed. Vor-Kil escaped from the Phantom Zone when sunspot activity opened a temporary gap to Earth. He battled Superman using the Kryptonian martial art of Klurkor. Superman lured him back into captivity with the help of Jimmy Olsen.
 Dr. Xadu - Dr. Xadu was sentenced to 30 Kryptonian sun-cycles (41.1 Earth years) for breaking the law which forbids the use of suspended animation in any scientific research. He later escaped the Phantom Zone with a prisoner named Erndine Ze-Da when a South Seas volcano exploded and opened a temporary gap in the Phantom Zone. They concocted a plan to trap Superboy in the Zone, but he became aware of their scheme and stranded them on the planet Exon. Years later, Dr. Xadu and Erndine, who had since married and acquired the secret of the cosmic power-grip, escaped from Exon and returned to Earth. Superman defeated them again, and placed them in separate cells on two different worlds. Inexplicably, Dr. Xadu appeared in the Phantom Zone in many stories set between these two tales.
 Zan-Ar - The crime and sentencing of this prisoner was not revealed.
 Zan-Em - A psychic scientist who was banished to the Phantom Zone for unauthorized mind control experiments. As part of his plan to escape the Zone and trap Superboy there, Zan-Em mentally manipulated Lester Wallace into developing a hatred of aliens. When Lester projected Superboy into the Zone, Zan-Em remarked that he had been in the prison dimension for nearly two decades. Superboy escaped the Zone, leaving Zan-Em trapped in his prison.
 Zo-Mar - The criminal Zo-Mar was captured, sentenced to life for attempting to enslave all of Krypton, placed in suspended animation, and imprisoned in a space capsule which was placed into orbit around Krypton. After Krypton's destruction, the capsule drifted through space, and Zo-Mar eventually awakened and traveled to Earth. With the help of the Challengers of the Unknown, Superman captured Zo-Mar and projected him into the Phantom Zone.
 Unnamed Kandorian scientist - A scientist in Kandor was sentenced to 20 Kryptonian sun-cycles (27.4 Earth years) for performing experiments with the Z-Bomb, even though he was warned that it could accidentally blow up the bottle-city.
 Unnamed energy creature - An alien life form whose race evolved into pure energy followed an Earth probe back to Earth. The entity was able to possess and control other physical objects and beings, and used this ability to wreak havoc. Superman and Lois Lane tricked the creature into a Superman puppet, then projected it into the Phantom Zone.
 Two unnamed members of the Superman Revenge Squad - Two members of the Superman Revenge Squad attempted to enslave the people of New Krypton (a.k.a. Rokyn), but Superman foiled their plans by projecting them into the Phantom Zone.

Inmates in Post-Crisis
The following were imprisoned in the Phantom Zone:
 Az-Rel and Nadira Va-Dim - In the Post-Crisis, Az-Rel and his lover Nadira Va-Dim are Kryptonians that Ursa had enlisted to be sleeper agents on Earth.
 Bizarro - He was thrown into the Phantom Zone by the Kandorians.
 Car-Vex - A Kryptonian criminal who was banished to the Phantom Zone. General Zod later recruited her to be a sleeper agent on Earth where she infiltrated Project 7734 under the alias of Officer Romundi of the Science Police.
 Dev-Em - A Kryptonian who was arrested and imprisoned in the Phantom Zone for murder and perversion.
 Doomsday - Due to his adaptive powers, Doomsday evolved in a way where his fists tore through the Phantom Zone, allowing him to escape it.
 Faora -
 General Zod - A Kryptonian military general who was exiled to the Phantom Zone after trying to overthrow the Kryptonian Council so he could take over Krypton.
 Jax-Ur -
 Non - Non is a former friend and scientific colleague of Jor-El. After leading a separatist movement that planned to tell all of Krypton on what will happen to their planet, he is abducted and lobotomized by Krypton's Science Council. This leaves him a minimally-verbal and highly-aggressive brute. Some aspects of his personality survive and surface as an extreme kindness when dealing with children. Serving as General Zod's enforcer, he also becomes guardian and caregiver for Zod's son Chris Kent.
 Parasite - He was thrown into the Phantom Zone by the Kandorians.
 Prankster - He was thrown into the Phantom Zone by the Kandorians.
 Prometheus -
 Quex-Ul - In the Post-Crisis, Quex-Ul is a Kryptonian criminal who was banished to the Phantom Zone and was later recruited by General Zod to be a sleeper agent on Earth.
 Silver Banshee - She was thrown into the Phantom Zone by the Kandorians.
 Tor-An - A Kryptonian who was on General Zod's side and was imprisoned in the Phantom Zone. When Ursa was charged with assigning five Krypontians as sleeper agents on Earth, Tor-An assumed the identity of a human entrepreneur named David Carter and became the CEO of the Empire Communications Network based out of Sydney Australia. He was defeated by Flamebird and Nightwing and reimprisoned in the Phantom Zone. Tor-An was later killed by Ursa.
 Toyman - He was thrown into the Phantom Zone by the Kandorians.
 Ursa - Ursa is the lover of General Zod and mother of Chris Kent. After Non is lobotomized by the Science Council, she instigated open rebellion along with General Zod. As a result, the three were exiled to the Phantom Zone.
 Val-Ty - A Kryptonian sociopath who once fought Tomar-Re whom he eluded by destroying Xan City. He was later captured and placed in the Phantom Zone. When Zod's blanket amnesty was issued, he and the other Phantom Zone criminals were released. Unlike the group who went with Ursa, Val stayed on New Krypton, going rogue. He was the target of a manhunt by the Military Guild, and was eventually captured by Kal-El's Red Shard for which he has vowed revenge.
 White Martians -

Inmates in All-Star Superman
 Bar-El - A Kryptonian astronaut who was one of a few survivors of Krypton. He and Lilo were placed in the Phantom Zone until Superman can find a cure for their Kryptonite illness.
 Lilo - A Kryptonian astronaut who was one of a few survivors of Krypton. She and Bar-El were placed in the Phantom Zone until Superman can find a cure for their Kryptonite illness.

Inmates in The New 52/DC Rebirth
 Cyborg Superman - 
 General Zod - 
 Hades - 
 Jax-Ur - 
 Lar-On - A Kryptonian who was banished to the Phantom Zone after Red Kryptonite turned him into a werewolf. After a fight with Supergirl, he was placed in the care of the D.E.O. where they found that the Red Kryptonite mangled his DNA where Supergirl quoted: "He isn't truly Kryptonian anymore".
 Lor-Zod - 
 Mongul - 
 Non - 
 Ras-Krom - 
 Ursa - 
 Vak-Ox - 
 Xa-Du - Also known as the "Phantom King", Xa-Du was a Kryptonian researcher, interested in improving research into suspended animation. However, the unethical nature of his studies led to the Kryptonian Science Council suspending his research and choosing him as the first inmate of the Phantom Zone. A sociopath, Xa-Du swore revenge on the family of the Phantom Zone's discoverer, Jor-El and his son, forming the "Anti-Superman Army".

Other versions

Superman & Batman: Generations
In the Elseworlds tale Superman & Batman: Generations, Superman is sentenced to the Phantom Zone in 1989 when he is stripped of his powers in a confrontation with the Ultra-Humanite that ends with his foe's death, after the Ultra-Humanite's actions led to the death of Superman's wife Lois Lane and his son Joel being tricked into killing Superman's daughter Kara before Joel dies himself, as well as arranging various 'accidents' for Clark Kent's other remaining loved ones. The judges reason that even if Superman feels that he may have killed his foe deliberately after the deaths of his family and friends, putting him in a conventional prison without his powers would be dangerous and solitary confinement was too extreme given his past deeds, selecting the Zone based on the suggestion of the new Batman, Bruce Wayne Junior. Superman is released in 1999 by the now-rejuvenated Bruce Wayne as Bruce returns to the role of Batman - Bruce noting that he is ending the sentence a few months early but is certain that nobody would object to early release "for good behavior" - although Superman was briefly able to appear as a phantom in the real world in 1997 to distract a foe who was about to kill Knightwing (Superman's grandson, adopted by Batman's son after the deaths of Superman's children).

In other media

Television
 The Phantom Zone appears in Super Friends. The Super Friends version of the Phantom Zone is described by the narrator as "far beyond the boundaries of the Milky Way. In the uncharted void of deep space. An incredible 5th dimension of space and time, lies parallel to the universe that we know. This interesting interstellar warp which holds the most sinister and ruthless criminals in the galaxy is the infamous Phantom Zone". The molecular structure of any person exiled in the Zone appears white and black. Batman's devices and the Wonder Twins' Exxor Powers are useless within the Phantom Zone.
 In the Challenge of the Super Friends episode "Terror from the Phantom Zone", a comet's collision causes the Phantom Zone to release three Kryptonian villains named Hul (voiced by Stanley Jones), Rom-Lok (voiced by Michael Bell), and Logar (voiced by Bob Holt) who are exclusive to this series. The villains go on a crime spree and banish the Super Friends to the Phantom Zone, but keep Superman on Earth where they exposed him to Red Kryptonite which causes him to age quickly, though the Red Kryptonite also gave Rom-Lok an appearance that resembles Shaggy Man. The villains get great enjoyment showing off "old Superman" to the world. Superman, with help from the Justice League computer, manages to figure out that Blue Kryptonite may reverse the aging process because blue kryptonite is harmful to Bizarro and therefore should be helpful to Superman. Superman finds the Blue Kryptonite and is aged back to normal, then goes on his quest to rescue the other Super Friends and ultimately send the three villains back into the Phantom Zone.
 Hul, Rom-Lok, and Logar later return in a "lost season" episode of the Super Friends titled "Return of the Phantoms" reprised by Stanley Jones, Michael Bell, and Bob Holt where their appearances have been redesigned. Here, they hijack an alien's time-space conveyor and go back in time to Smallville and attack Superboy to prevent him from becoming Superman. The pilot of that craft went to warn the Super Friends about what the trio would be attempting and guided Superman and Green Lantern to the proper time period to help the boy.
 The Phantom Zone appears in the Superman episode "The Hunter". General Zod and his female followers Ursa and Faora are shown as prisoners in the Phantom Zone.
 Although the Phantom Zone is not explicitly mentioned or shown in Lois & Clark: The New Adventures of Superman, there is a similar type of medium which resembles its representation in season four episodes "Meet John Doe" and "Lois and Clarks". An Utopian from the future Andrus programmed a "time tablet" to trap fugitive Tempus in a space-time cube if he tried to control the tablet. However, Tempus tricked Superman into being trapped in the cube, which was then lost in space-time. Superman was rescued by H.G. Wells when the exact second Clark who disappeared was discovered. Another episode from that season "Battleground Earth" featured another analogue, a Kryptonian form of capital punishment (practiced by a surviving colony), devices capable of scattering a criminal's body across the universe. Superman was sentenced to this punishment, but due to newly discovered facts and a violation of procedure the process was reversed before it could be completed. It is unclear whether a fully complete procedure could be reversed, and if so, whether there is a point after which it becomes irreversible. Superman was feeling shaky immediately after the procedure (which appeared to be painful), but recovered quickly.
 The Phantom Zone is first mentioned in the first episode of Superman: The Animated Series titled "The Last Son of Krypton, Part 1". Jor-El attempted to convince everyone to enter the Zone to be saved from Krypton's destruction and one man would be sent via spaceship to re-establish Krypton's population on a new world. This idea was not accepted by Krypton's Science Council and Jor-El sent his son in the spaceship to Earth along with the Phantom Zone projector. In "Blasts from the Past", Superman discovers the Phantom Zone projector which also has a communication function that allows him to converse with the inmates. He makes contact with the convicted traitor Mala (a loose adaptation of Superman II'''s Ursa). He learns that Mala's 20-year sentence in the Zone is finished and releases her. Superman hoped to train Mala as his co-worker, but soon learns that Mala is arrogant and power-hungry, enough to possibly require returning her to the Zone. When she learns that Kal-El (Superman's Kryptonian name) is in relationship with Lois Lane, Mala turns against Superman, and later releases General Jax-Ur (an amalgam of Jax-Ur and General Zod) to take over Earth. They were later banished once again into the Phantom Zone. In "Absolute Power", Jax-Ur and Mala are later accidentally released on another remote planet where they remake it into Krypton's image. During a fight with the Kryptonian fleet, Jax-Ur and Mala are ultimately sent into a black hole.
 In the Justice League Unlimited episode "The Doomsday Sanction", Superman and the Justice League send the nearly unstoppable Doomsday into the Phantom Zone after his capture. This usage of the Zone, effectively sentencing Doomsday to life imprisonment without trial, presented massive arguments about the Justice League's right to make such judgments. Batman was especially troubled by this move because their verdict on Doomsday would have been a decision that the Justice Lords would have made.
 In the Legion of Super Heroes animated series, the Phantom Zone is close to its classical portrayal as a parallel dimension where criminals are sent. As a throwback to the Pre-Crisis version, inhabitants of the Zone become incorporeal - essentially, ghost-like phantoms - thus giving the Zone its name. In this series, Superman discovers his previous self's Phantom Zone projector which he accidentally uses to free a villain named Drax (Greg Ellis). The projector is eventually turned on the other Legionnaires, but with Phantom Girl's help, they manage to escape without it and send Drax back at the same time. On a related note, Drax mentioned that he was born in the Phantom Zone.
 The Phantom Zone appears in the television series Smallville. Known inmates are General Zod and later his genetic clone (Callum Blue), Faora (Sharon Taylor), Nam-Ek (Leonard Roberts), Aethyr (Alana de la Garza), Dr. Hudson (Matthew Walker), Baern (Bow Wow), Gloria (Amber McDonald), Aldar (Dave Bautista), Titan (Kane), and Slade Wilson. Some of the inmates like Zod and Faora were stripped of their corporal bodies where they became phantoms. Outside of its glass-like entrance, the Phantom Zone resembles a desert-like wasteland that has a blue sun which doesn't set. In the 5th-season premiere "Arrival", Clark Kent battles two evil Kryptonians named Nam-Ek & Aethyr that are disciples of Zod. When he refuses to join them in their quest to subjugate Earth, the Kryptonians attempt to banish Clark to the Zone using a metallic bracelet (inscribed with Kryptonian symbols) that opens up a vortex. Clark later manages to turn the tables, sending them into the portal to the Phantom Zone instead. Aside from its entrance, the Zone is represented as a floating black square, similar to its depiction in the Superman films. In "Solitude", the Kryptonian artificial intelligence known as Brainiac (posing as Professor Milton Fine) manipulates Clark into believing that Jor-El is responsible for Martha's mysterious illness, as part of a plot to free the imprisoned General Zod. Professor Fine persuades Clark to take him to the Fortress of Solitude, where he gives Clark a black crystal and instructs him to insert it into the Fortress' control console, misleadingly saying that it will destroy Jor-El and therefore save Martha. The crystal, once inserted into the console, instead opens up a vortex in which another black square is seen, with a figure resembling General Zod as portrayed in the Superman film, but Brainiac's plan is thwarted once Clark removes the crystal. In the episode "Vessel", General Zod is finally freed from the Phantom Zone. After inhabiting Lex Luthor, Zod traps Clark inside the Zone using a Kryptonian bracelet similar to the one used in "Arrival". In the 6th season premiere, the Phantom Zone itself is shown as a desolate wasteland where Clark is rendered powerless and mortal. It is revealed to have been created by Jor-El as a prison for not only Kryptonian convicts, but also criminals from the "28 known galaxies". The more dangerous prisoners (e.g. General Zod and Bizarro) are stripped of their corporeal forms and their spirits are then cast into the Zone. Clark escapes with the help of a Kryptonian woman named Raya (Pascale Hutton) who claims to have known Jor-El and was placed in the Phantom Zone by Jor-El to protect her from Krypton's destruction. To ensure her survival, Jor-El sent Raya to the Zone just before the destruction of Krypton. Raya reveals that those of the blood of Jor-El's house can utilize a secret exit from the Phantom Zone, therefore Clark can leave. Upon escaping the Zone, Clark accidentally releases Raya and various prisoners and phantoms to Earth. Chloe Sullivan later refers to the escaped convicts as "Zoners" and Superman had to either eliminate them or send them back to the Phantom Zone. In the season 7 finale, "Arctic", it is revealed that Brainiac has trapped Kara in the Zone. In the season eight episode "Bloodline", Clark and Lois are both trapped in the Phantom Zone, where they are reunited with Kara. Also, Zod's wife Faora takes control of Lois' body so she can be set free by Kara, and goes on a rampage in Metropolis. In the season 10 episode "Icarus", Clark uses a crystal of El to send Slade Wilson to the Phantom Zone. When Wilson is found back on Earth in "Dominion", Clark and Oliver Queen enter the Zone to see how that escape was possible. They learn that the clone of Zod - who was sent to New Krypton with the others - was sent to the Phantom Zone for his crimes. While there, he merged with the phantom of the original Zod, gaining all of his memories, and a blood transfusion from Clark allowed him to send others out of the Phantom Zone. Clark departs the Zone with Green Arrow while destroying the control console on the Phantom Zone side to prevent anyone else from leaving.
 In the pilot episode of Supergirl, Kara's capsule accidentally ended up in the Phantom Zone - which is depicted as an actual area of real-space in which time does not pass/exist rather than a separate dimension - following Krypton's explosion. It was also shown that the Zone had a maximum security prison called Fort Rozz which housed criminals like Astra In-Ze, Caren Falqnerr, the Commander, Dr. Alphonse Luzano, Gabriel Phillips, Gor, a Hellgrammite, Indigo, Jemm, K'hund, Kerfuffle, Moyer, Mur, Non, Tor, and Vartox where they have personal issues with Alura Zor-El who had them imprisoned in Fort Rozz Prison. The Master Jailer was one of the prison guards in Fort Rozz. When Kara's capsule left the Phantom Zone, Fort Rozz was intentionally pulled out with her as Indigo revealed that she took control of Kara's escape pod to do that. As a result of Fort Rozz being pulled out of the Phantom Zone and crashing on Earth, many of its inmates escaped. Additionally, there is also a Phantom Zone projector - a device used by Kryptonians to transport prisoners in Fort Rozz into the Zone. It was later collected and stored in the Fortress of Solitude by Kal-El/Superman. In "Resist", Kara, Lilian Luthor and Hank Henshaw use this projector to board into a Daxamite ship during their invasion to save Lena Luthor and Mon-El from Rhea. After rescuing them, Lilian betrays and leaves Kara and Mon-El behind while beaming her daughter and themselves to the Fortress, but Kara expected her betrayal and her friend Winn Schott Jr. put a bug device on Hank prior to the rescue operation. Supergirl turned on the device to force Hank to reactivate the projector to beam Mon-El out of the spaceship, while she stayed behind to confront Rhea. In season 5, it was revealed that the Green Martians had utilized the Phantom Zone which they used to imprison Ma'alefa'ak and Midnight. In season 6, Supergirl ended up sent to the Phantom Zone by Lex Luthor after he was hit by the fragment from the planet Jarhanpur. Due to the location information being wiped from the projector, Supergirl's group works to find her. As a result of the events of the "Crisis on Infinite Earths", the Phantom Zone was broken up like an archipelago and is infested with Phantom Zone Phantoms (known by their real names of Zulian Maletarians). It was also revealed that the vampiric Transilvanian Silas was the first to break into the Phantom Zone to look for his wrongly-convicted boyfriend. In addition, Zor-El survived the destruction of Krypton by projecting himself into the Phantom Zone. Supergirl later met the 5th Dimension Imp Nyxlygsptlnz who aids her in rescuing Zor-El, though Nyxlgyspnlnz has her own plans to return to Earth so that she can return to the 5th Dimension to get revenge on her father. When the Super Friends rescue Supergirl and Zor-El from the Phantom Zone and depart from it in the Tower, they are unaware that Nyxlygsptlnz stowed away on top of the Tower.
 The Phantom Zone appears in the Justice League Action episode "Field Trip". As Superman gives Blue Beetle, Firestorm, and Stargirl a tour of the Fortress of Solitude, they are shown to the Phantom Zone projector where General Zod, Faora and Quex-Ul are accidentally released and Superman is trapped. With some guidance from Martin Stein, Firestorm learns how to transmute some of the ice into Kryptonite to weaken the Kryptonian villains. Afterwards, Superman is freed from the Phantom Zone and the Kryptonian villains are thrown back in the Zone.
 The Phantom Zone appears in TV series Krypton. Here, it is an interdimensional realm existing outside of space and time. Seg's grandfather Val-El created the technology to travel into the zone, to find other galaxies in the universe. Val-El escaped through it after his supposed execution. Another individual, General Zod from the future, encountered him, stole his device and left him behind. In the titular season one finale, Val is brought back to Krypton. When Brainiac attempts to "bottle" Kandor City, Seg-El and Zod trapped him with the Phantom Zone projector, but Seg is also trapped. Zod destroys the projector to prevent Brainiac's return. In the season two premiere, "Light-Years From Home", Seg tries to find an exit from the Zone. Brainiac (disguised as a "hallucination" of Val) convinces Seg to use his sunstone to open a wormhole into the real world, eventually escaping from the Phantom Zone and transporting to Brainiac's home planet Colu.
 The Phantom Zone briefly appears in the episode "Devil's Snare" from the first season of the adult animated series Harley Quinn. Believing that Harley Quinn, Poison Ivy, and their crew are behind a series of man-eating trees terrorizing Gotham, Superman and the Justice League prepare to trap them all in the Phantom Zone before Poison Ivy uses Wonder Woman's Lasso of Truth to clear their names. The Zone appears again in the second-season episode "Lovers' Quarrel" where Batman, Superman and Wonder Woman attempt to imprison Poison Ivy (who is mind controlled by Doctor Psycho) inside it, but are stopped by Harley.
 The Phantom Zone is mentioned in the 2019 animated series, DC Super Hero Girls, in two-part episode "DC Super Hero Boys".
 The Phantom Zone is an important factor in the fourth season (titled "Phantoms") of Young Justice. Known inmates include General Zod, Ursa, Faora, Non, Jax-Ur, Vor-Kil, and Kru-El. Superboy is sent there alongside a comatose Phantom Girl who managed to survive the explosion in the midst of the chaos when Superboy stopped the gene-bomb from eradicating the Green and Red Martians on Mars. He desperately tries to find a way to escape the dimension, all the while carrying the ghostly form of his savior, but begins to fall under the affects of the Phantom Zone, hallucinating his friends and enemies until eventually gaining amnesia. The sorceress Zatanna Zatara had happened to glimpse him begging for help via a spell that had allowed her to see the decade time-traveling journey that the children and driver of a school bus had been forced to endure due to Klarion anchoring his dark essence to the vehicle to maintain his presence in the mortal plane. However, Zatanna misinterprets, believing Superboy's ghost is calling out for help, unaware he is still alive and is trapped inside the Phantom Zone. Superboy later meets Dru-Zod, who was sent to the Zone as a prisoner alongside his wife, Ursa and their followers. The sickness Superboy gets from the Phantom Zone resets her personality back to his original Cadmus programming.

Films
Live action
Serials
 In the 1950 film serial, Atom Man vs. Superman, Lex Luthor traps Superman in another dimension. Though the Phantom Zone would not appear in the comics until 11 years later, it is styled in the same fashion and is named by Luthor as the Empty Doom.

1978 film series
 In the 1978 Superman film starring Christopher Reeve, the Phantom Zone is presented as a large, flat rhombus-shaped mirror that moves by spinning. Jor-El (Marlon Brando), who developed the Phantom Zone summons it with a wand to imprison General Zod (Terence Stamp) and his co-conspirators Ursa (Sarah Douglas), and Non (Jack O'Halloran), who appear to be transferred into the two-dimensional space on the mirror's surface, which is then flung into deep space. The Phantom Zone is only referred to by name in the extended versions of Superman when it is mentioned by the Kryptonian First Elder. Superman's mother Lara refers to the Phantom Zone by name in Superman II when she first makes the revelation about the three villains contained inside it. In his DVD commentary, director Richard Donner refers to it as "the Zone of Silence".
 In Superman II, as Superman saves the city of Paris from destruction by hurling a nuclear bomb into space, the resulting nuclear explosion inadvertently shatters the Phantom Zone and releases the three prisoners. Now free, General Zod and his cohorts travel to Earth, wreaking havoc with the superpowers granted to them by Earth's yellow sun. The Phantom Zone appears in Richard Donner's cut of Superman II, released in November 2006. In this version (per the original shooting script prior to being altered by director Richard Lester for the theatrical version), the Phantom Zone is shattered by the rocket Superman threw into space in the first Superman film. The Zone is shown splitting into three separate shards, one containing each villain, before it finally shatters, freeing them. Jor-El presents a visual representation of the Phantom Zone and its occupants in a recorded message embedded in the education crystals housed at the Fortress of Solitude, unaware that he is actually talking to Lex Luthor and Miss Teschmacher. After defeating Zod and his followers, Superman uses a time-warp to keep the three criminals imprisoned in the Zone while undoing the damage they had done during their time on Earth.
 In the 1984 Supergirl spin-off, the sorceress Selena banishes Kara to the Phantom Zone by means of a summoned crystal shard. The crystal transports her to a barren, desolate world where it shatters, casting her to the ground. This depiction of the Phantom Zone suggests that the crystal shard seen in the first two Superman movies is not the Phantom Zone itself, but simply a vehicle that takes prisoners to this desolate wasteland which is referred to as the Phantom Zone, similar to the later Smallville TV series. Once in the Zone, Kara loses her powers as Supergirl and becomes an ordinary mortal. In this film, it is also revealed that there is a way out of the Zone, although the trip to the exit portal is extremely dangerous and would almost lead to certain death. Kara is guided to this portal by Zaltar, another Kryptonian who was banished there. Kara is successfully able to transport herself back to Earth using this portal, although Zaltar is killed in the attempt. Following Kara's escape, the defeated Selena and her henchwoman Bianca are both banished to the Phantom Zone.

DC Extended Universe
 In the 2013 reboot film Man of Steel, General Zod, Faora, Car-Vex, Dev-Em II, Jax-Ur, Nadira, Nam-Ek, Tor-An, and some unnamed followers of General Zod are sentenced to 300 cycles of somatic reconditioning in the Phantom Zone following their attempted coup against the Kryptonian government and General Zod's murder of Jor-El. The ship then launches into orbit around Krypton where three smaller vessels establish a window into the Phantom Zone into which the ship enters. A short time later, the destruction of Krypton triggers the release of the prisoners. Later in the film, the vessels Zod and his army are using possess a "Phantom Drive", a collision from a smaller ship (piloted by Col. Hardy of the U.S. military with Kal-El's rocket and operated by Professor Emil Hamilton and Lois Lane) with a similar drive causes a cataclysmic reaction that creates a small singularity, returning the ship and its occupants to the Zone.

Animation
 In Superman: Brainiac Attacks, Superman had to enter the Phantom Zone to retrieve a rare element which will cure Lois Lane of a deadly disease. This version of the Phantom Zone differs from the previous animated continuity, as it is shown to actually be populated by "phantoms" and Superman retains his powers in the Phantom Zone.
 The Phantom Zone is featured in All-Star Superman. Like the comics, Superman places Bar-El and Lilo into the Phantom Zone until a cure for their Kryptonite illness can be found.
 In The Lego Batman Movie, the Phantom Zone appears as a prison for the most dangerous villains in the Lego universe. Its gatekeeper "Phyllis" (voiced by Ellie Kemper) resembles a generic Lego brick and reviews the bad things the new arrivals have done. The Phantom Zone's inmates consist of villains from various franchises including General Zod, King Kong, Voldemort, the Eye of Sauron from The Lord of the Rings, the Daleks from Doctor Who, the Gremlins, the Wicked Witch of the West and her Flying Monkeys from The Wizard of Oz, Lord Vampyre, the Evil Mummy, and the Swamp Creature from Lego Monster Fighters, the Kraken from Clash of the Titans, Medusa from Lego Minifigures, the skeletons from Jason and the Argonauts, Agent Smith from The Matrix, the titular great white shark from Jaws, and the Tyrannosaurus rex and Velociraptors from Jurassic Park. This group of villains have been referred to as the "Ubers" in the credits. Superman talked about it on the news program "Metropolis in Focus" as a tie-in to his latest victory over General Zod. When the Joker gets sent to the Phantom Zone by Batman, he persuades the inmates that he meets in the Zone to help him take over Gotham City. After infiltrating Arkham Asylum, Harley Quinn helps release them using the Phantom Zone Projector under the "Release All Inmates" option. With help from Robin, Batgirl, Alfred Pennyworth, and Gotham City's villains, Batman manages to defeat the villains and send them back to the Phantom Zone.

Video games
 In the video game Mortal Kombat vs. DC Universe, the DC portion of the story mode concludes with Emperor Shao Kahn being imprisoned in the Phantom Zone after Superman defeats Dark Kahn. In Shao Kahn's single player ending, it is revealed that the Phantom Zone has the opposite effect on him. Rather than being depowered, Shao Kahn is re-energized by the Zone's energies and breaks free of it with an untold number of prisoners who swear allegiance to Shao Kahn for releasing them. The Phantom Zone in the game resembles its portrayal from Superman: The Movie and Superman II.
 The Phantom Zone appears in DC Universe Online. Lex Luthor frees General Zod from it during the Fortress of Solitude raid to combat Brainiac's assimilation of the Fortress. During the Phantom Zone alert, players receive a signal from it and are asked to investigate by Superman, and it turns out to be a trap meant for him. Time appears to pass at a much slower rate inside the Zone, as Superman mentions weeks have passed outside during the alert as he rescues the player team.
 The Phantom Zone appears in Injustice: Gods Among Us, also resembling its portrayal in Superman: The Movie and Superman II. According to some character profiles, the Phantom Zone is used by the alternate Superman to "re-educate" several supervillains into joining the Regime, suggesting that the alternate Superman spares villains if he believes they could be useful (such as Bane and Killer Frost). Near the end of Story Mode, the Zone is used by the "prime" Superman to safely seal away the alternate Doomsday after the monster is defeated. A portal leading into the Phantom Zone can be found in the Fortress of Solitude stage, combatants can be knocked into a Phantom Zone projector and then spat out of a portal taking damage. They can also be knocked into the Phantom Zone itself at the far left side of the menagerie section where they will collide with one of the crystal fragments housing a monstrous "Phantom". The inmate will proceed to take a bite out of the fighter's shoulder before being knocked off by a floating rock, and then the fighter will fall through a second Zone portal winding up in the laboratory section of the stage. The character General Zod has limited control of the Phantom Zone as part of his special moves, and can summon an inmate for help as well as momentarily trap his opponent within the Phantom Zone. If Classic Battle is cleared, a cutscene will show the Regime's Superman being sucked into the Phantom Zone's portal in the menagerie. As he is pulled closer to the portal while refusing to get away, he has several flashbacks of Lois Lane, her death at the Joker's hands, the destruction of Metropolis and his murder of the Joker, the Regime's Superman gets his soul taken by the Phantom Zone's portal before being pulled into the Zone by a "Phantom". The Regime's Superman is then seen trapped inside a diamond-shaped crystal screaming in anguish as he drifts further into the Phantom Zone. General Zod's ending in Classic Battle reveals that Zod's imprisonment has granted him the knowledge necessary to utilize some of the Phantom Zone at will (explaining some of his in-game abilities) as well as his plans to use such abilities in future conquests after he has trapped the Regime's Superman in the Phantom Zone and took over the Regime so that he can make Earth into the image of Krypton.
 The Phantom Zone projector appears in Scribblenauts Unmasked: A DC Comics Adventure. General Zod escapes from the Phantom Zone and seals Superman in it. Maxwell manages to free Superman and place General Zod back in the Zone.
 The Phantom Zone appears in Lego Dimensions. It appears as the fifth stage of the Lego Batman Movie story pack, adapting its role from the film.
 The Phantom Zone appears in Injustice 2. If Batman defeats Superman in the story's climax, he depowers Superman with a machine similar to the one from Superman II and sends him into the Phantom Zone as Superman swears to return. In Batman's character ending, Batman goes into semi-retirement to head the emergency response in the wake of Brainiac's attack as Bruce Wayne, leaving the reformed Barry Allen and Hal Jordan to lead the Justice League and train the next generation of heroes. Though behind the scenes, Batman he prepares for the possibility of Superman's escape from the Phantom Zone by developing Kryptonite-based weaponry. In Sub-Zero's ending, Sub-Zero is accidentally transported to Injustice Earth by the magic unleashed by Kotal Kahn's retreat from Earthrealm to Outworld. He helps to defeat Brainiac and thanks Batman and the Justice League for offer to help him return to Earthrealm, though they inadvertently open a portal to the Phantom Zone that frees Superman, General Zod, Ursa, and Non. Feeling responsible, Sub-Zero fights alongside Batman's Justice League to defeat Superman and his Kryptonian allies.

Novels
 In Kevin J. Anderson's novel The Last Days of Krypton, Jor-El discovered and was temporarily trapped in the Phantom Zone. Commissioner (later General) Dru-Zod confiscates the Phantom Zone, claiming it would be dangerous in the wrong hands, and proceeds to use it to imprison his political enemies. After Zod's insurgence/rebellion fails, his enemies are released and Zod, his consort Aethyr-Ka, and his muscle-man Nam-Ek become the sole prisoners of the Phantom Zone. In a mistaken attempt to destroy the Phantom Zone, several of Zod's former prisoners cast the Phantom Zone to the center of the Planet Krypton after being elected to the planet's ruling Council. This causes the planet's core to first implode, and then explode. Fortunately Jor-El and Lara were able to rescue their son Kal-El by sending him into space just before the planet's explosion. He arrived on Earth where he became known as Clark Kent/Superman.

Parodies and homages
 In the South Park episode "Krazy Kripples", Christopher Reeve is imprisoned in one after eating too many fetuses.
 In Bartman Meets Radioactive Man, Radioactive Man is imprisoned in the Limbo Zone.
 Family Guy parodied the Phantom Zone in the episode "Lethal Weapons". When Peter announced that "Krypton sucks", General Zod, Non, and Ursa came by and were promptly bested in a fight by Lois, and imprisoned in a Phantom Zone reminiscent of the Superman films. In the episode "Hot Pocket-Dial", General Zod is shown to live next door to the apartment that Glenn Quagmire moved into and told him that he was blocking his "trapezoid-shaped thing" (a reference to the Phantom Zone of the Superman films).
 An American Dad! episode "The Most Adequate Christmas Ever" shows that God imprisoned Jim Henson and Kermit the Frog in the Phantom Zone when they tried to get into Heaven. It then shows Jim Henson and Kermit the Frog flying above in their rectangular prison as they beg to be released and forgiven.
 A dimension referred to as the "Null Void" appears in the television series Ben 10 (and its various iterations Ben 10: Alien Force, Ben 10: Ultimate Alien, and Ben 10: Omniverse) and is used as an inter-dimensional prison for containing various alien criminals in the Ben 10 universe. It is primarily accessible via a "Null Void Generator", a device similar in design and application to Superman's Phantom Zone Projector. In some episodes of Alien Force and Ultimate Alien, there is a version of Incarcecon that is in the Null Void which is used to imprison the criminals there.
 A Lego set released in 2017, titled "Batman in the Phantom Zone" features a Batman minifigure and a machine.
 In the opening skit of the season 2 premiere of Robot Chicken titled "Suck It", series co-creator Seth Green, along with the robot chicken and mad scientist from the opening credits sequence, were briefly banished to the Phantom Zone (similar to that of the Superman films) after being found guilty from his trial following the show's "cancellation" from season 1 by the Adult Swim Council (consisting of Peter Griffin, Spae Ghost, and Master Shake from Aqua Teen Hunger Force).
 Lord Buckethead's manifesto in the 2017 United Kingdom general election included a promise to exile Katie Hopkins to the Phantom Zone.

Similar dimensions
There had been similar Zones that were in comparison to the Phantom Zone:
 The Silver Age Phantom Zone appears to be prefigured in the 1950 Superman serial Atom Man vs. Superman, in which Lex Luthor uses a kind of matter-transmitter device to trap Superman in a limbo called the "Empty Doom" from which he can see and hear events in the "real" world, but cannot touch anything or be seen or heard.
 In the Captain Future novel Planets in Peril (1942) by Edmond Hamilton, Chapter 13 "Phantom Prisoners", Captain Future is sent to the "Vault of the Unbodied", essentially an early version of the Phantom Zone. Hamilton later went on to write some of the early DC comics Superman stories, including some Phantom Zone stories.
 Additionally, in the story "Wonder Woman's Wedding Day" from Wonder Woman #70 (November 1954), Wonder Woman is sent by Professor Uxo to another dimension much like the Phantom Zone, in which she becomes a spectral observer, unable to interact with those around her. She is able to escape by telepathically overwhelming Professor Uxo with the thought she is watching his every move, forcing him to "reassemble" her in his laboratory before a barrage of bullets, which she easily deflects. Wonder Woman captures Professor Uxo and his henchmen as they are taken away by the police while his "time dimension transfer machine" is damaged beyond repair.

Notes

References

External links
 Supermanica: Phantom Zone Supermanica entry on the Pre-Crisis'' Phantom Zone
 Phantom Zone at DC Comics Wiki
 Phantom Zone at Comic Vine

Fictional elements introduced in 1961
DC Comics dimensions
DC Comics planets
DC Comics titles
Fictional dimensions
Legion of Super-Heroes
Fictional prisons